Escherichia virus T5, sometimes called Bacteriophage T5 is a caudal virus within the family Demerecviridae. This bacteriophage specifically infects E. coli bacterial cells and follows a lytic life cycle.

Structure and genome 

The T5 virion includes a 90 nanometer icosahedral capsid (head) and a 250 nanometer-long flexible, non-contractile tail.

The capsid contains the phage's 121,750 base pair, double-stranded DNA genome which encodes about 168 proteins (now reduced to 162). The genome has a unique sequence of 111,613 bp with two identical large direct terminal repetitions of 10,139 bp. When the genome sequence was published in 2005, only 61 (36.3%) of the 168 encoded proteins had been assigned functions based on homology to known sequences. More than half of all genes (92 or 54.7%) were predicted ORFs lacking similarity to any known proteins. The number of uncharacterized proteins remains high at about 50% of the genome (based on the latest annotation of the reference proteome in Uniprot, 2021).

Infection 
Bacteriophage T5 has been shown to infect E. coli after its receptor binding protein, pb5, binds to the host cell's outer membrane ferrichrome transporter, FhuA. The binding triggers structural changes in pb5 and eventually leads to DNA release from the phage capsid.

References

External links 
 UniProt: Enterobacteria phage T5
 NCBI Taxonomy: Enterobacteria phage T5

Bacteriophages
Caudovirales